Təklə or Teklya or Tegle or Taklya may refer to:
Təklə Mirzəbaba, Azerbaijan
Təklə, Agsu, Azerbaijan
Təklə, Gobustan, Azerbaijan
Təklə, Jalilabad, Azerbaijan
Təklə, Kurdamir, Azerbaijan
Təklə, Masally, Azerbaijan

See also
Təhlə (disambiguation)